Poço Encantado is a cave located near the Chapada Diamantina National Park.

See also
List of caves in Brazil

References

External links

The Enchanted Pool in Chapada Diamantina

Caves of Bahia